North Reddish is the northern part of Reddish, in Stockport, Greater Manchester.

North Reddish or Reddish North can refer to:

 A loosely defined geographical area covering the northern part of Reddish;
 A precisely defined ward named Reddish North that elects three Councillors to Stockport Metropolitan Borough Council; or
 A railway station in Reddish with commuter services to Manchester, Marple and Sheffield.

References

Geography of the Metropolitan Borough of Stockport
Areas of Greater Manchester